Lieutenant General Hon. Sir Leicester Smyth  (born Curzon-Howe; 25 October 1829 – 27 January 1891) was a British Army officer and colonial administrator who served as the Governor of Gibraltar.

Early life and education

Smyth was the seventh son of Richard Curzon-Howe, 1st Earl Howe and Lady Harriet Georgiana Brudenell, daughter of Robert Brudenell, 6th Earl of Cardigan. He was educated at Eton College.

Military career
Smyth was commissioned into the Rifle Brigade in 1845. He served in the Basuto War in 1852.

In 1854 he was appointed aide-de-camp to Lord Raglan and was present at the Battle of Alma, the Battle of Inkerman and the Siege of Sevastopol. He subsequently served as ADC to General Codrington.

He was made Assistant Military Secretary in the Ionian Islands in 1856, Military Secretary in Ireland in 1865 and Deputy Quartermaster in Ireland in 1872.

In 1877 he became General Officer Commanding Western District and in 1880 GOC Cape Colony. He was acting High Commissioner for Southern Africa from 1882 to 1883, GOC Southern District from 1889 to 1890 (in which capacity he hosted a visit by the Shah of Persia) and Governor of Gibraltar from 1890 until his death in 1891, aged 61.

Family
On 12 February 1866 in Dublin, he married Alicia Maria Eliza Smyth, daughter and heiress of Robert Smyth of Drumcree, County Westmeath. In November that year, he adopted his wife's maiden name in lieu of his own, and quartered the Smyth arms with the arms of Curzon-Howe. They had no children.

References

|-

|-

1829 births
1891 deaths
Military personnel from Leicester
British Army generals
Rifle Brigade officers
Knights Commander of the Order of the Bath
Knights Commander of the Order of St Michael and St George
British Army personnel of the Crimean War
British colonial governors and administrators in Africa
British colonial governors and administrators in Europe

Younger sons of earls
Curzon family
Leicester
Governors of Gibraltar